Elizabeth Stirling a.k.a. Elizabeth Bridge (26 February 1819 – 25 March 1895) was an English organist and composer.

Biography
Elizabeth Stirling was born in Greenwich, London, and studied piano and organ at the Royal Academy of Music with Edward Holmes and W. B. Wilson, and harmony with James Alexander Hamilton and Sir George Macfarren. In 1837 she performed a recital at St. Katherine's Church, Regent's Park, which was reviewed by The Musical World.

In 1839 she took a position as organist at All Saints Church, Poplar, where she remained until 1858. In that year, she was the successful competitor for the post of organist at St Andrew Undershaft, a position she filled until 1880. As an organist, she was noted for her exceptional pedal playing. She published two grand voluntaries; six pedal fugues; eight slow movements and other organ-pieces, over fifty songs and duets, and arrangements of the works of Bach, Mozart and Handel. Her most popular song was "All Among the Barley".

In 1863, she married Frederick Albert Bridge ('F.A. Bridge') (1841–1917), photographer, choirmaster of St Martin-in-the-Fields and organist and choirmaster of St Martin, Ludgate.

Works
 
Selected works include:
Romantic Pieces for Organ
Moderato and Maestoso, organ
The Dream, SSTB, piano
All Among The Barley, SATB
The Forester, SATB, piano
Back From the Brink, SATB, piano
Six Fugues for Organ On English Psalm Tunes, Arranged by Barbara Harbach

References

1819 births
1895 deaths
19th-century classical composers
English classical composers
British women classical composers
English organists
19th-century English musicians
People from the Royal Borough of Greenwich
Musicians from London
Alumni of the Royal Academy of Music
Women organists
19th-century British composers
19th-century women composers
19th-century organists